The 1988 NCAA Women's Gymnastics championship involved 12 schools competing for the national championship of women's NCAA Division I gymnastics.  It was the seventh NCAA gymnastics national championship and the defending NCAA Team Champion for 1986 was Georgia.  The competition took place in Salt Lake City, Utah hosted by the University of Utah in the Jon M. Huntsman Center. The 1988 Championship was won by Alabama, the third first time champion since Utah in 1982 and Georgia in 1987.

Georgia entered the competition as the defending champions while six-time champion Utah played host.  UCLA finished the regular season unbeaten and Pac-10 Champions, while SEC Champions Alabama garnered the top overall seed.  UCLA was ranked number 1 throughout most of the regular season but suffered a poor showing at regionals which resulted in them receiving a low seventh seed at the championship. The Bruins' regional also saw star gymnast Tanya Service suffer a dislocated elbow.  Alabama won the title with a record score of 190.050, giving coach Sarah Patterson her first of six titles.

Team Results

External links
 Gym Results

NCAA Women's Gymnastics championship
NCAA Women's Gymnastics Championship